Zona Universitària is a station in the Barcelona Metro and Trambaix networks, in the  Les Corts district of Barcelona. It is currently the western terminus of metro line L3 and L9. Also it's served by tram lines T1, T2 and T3. It is named after the Universitat de Barcelona campus of the same name.

The metro station is located under Avinguda Diagonal, between Carrer González Tablas and Avinguda Dr. Marañón. The entrance lobby features an artwork by the sculptor Angel Orensanz.

The metro station opened in 1975, along with the other stations of the section of L3 between Zona Universitària and Sants Estació stations. This section was originally operated separately from L3, and known as L3b, until the two sections were joined in 1982. In February 2016, the south branch of the L9 it opened from Aeroport T1 to this station, as a provisional terminal until it continue to connect the other branch of the line.

It is planned that the station will be served by the common section of metro lines L9 and L10, and work is currently underway to build the L10 and the extension to the upper area of the city of these lines. In the longer term, an extension of line L3 beyond Zona Universitària is planned.

See also
University of Barcelona
List of Barcelona Metro stations
List of tram stations in Barcelona

References

External links

Avinguda Diagonal
Barcelona Metro line 3 stations
Barcelona Metro line 9 stations
Trambaix stops
Railway stations in Spain opened in 1975
1975 establishments in Catalonia